B. Traven: The Life Behind the Legends is a biography of the novelist B. Traven by Karl Guthke. Originally published in German as B. Traven: Biographie eines Rätsels in 1987, Robert Sprung translated the book into English in 1991.

Bibliography

External links 

 

1987 non-fiction books
Biographies about anarchists
German-language books
Biographies about writers